Camilla "Milly" Durrant (born 9 May 1985) is a former Welsh former international football midfielder. After attending the youth academy of Arsenal Ladies and a scholarship at Florida International University, Durrant played FA Women's Premier League football for Doncaster Rovers Belles, Birmingham City Ladies and Coventry City Ladies.

Club career
Durrant began playing football aged five with her father Andy, who had played for England U–18s. She played with the boys at Penglais School and the Aberystwyth Centre of Excellence, while also featuring for Tregaron Ladies.

After a successful trial, Durrant joined the Arsenal Academy as a 16-year-old in 2001. She moved on to play for Langford Ladies and spent the summer of 2003 in America. In 2006, she scored six goals in eight games for Florida International University's varsity soccer team. Returning to the UK, she joined Doncaster Rovers Belles in 2005, from where she joined Birmingham City Ladies in 2007.

In August 2008, Durrant, along with Birmingham teammate Cristina Torkildsen and Chelsea Ladies player Emma Delves, played in the 'Go Sisters World Series' charity match in aid of the charity 'Friend of EduSport'. Torkildsen and Durrant joined Coventry City on loan the following season. In 2010–11 Durrant helped The Sky Blues to a second successive promotion, into the FA Women's Premier League National Division.

After helping Coventry consolidate their position at the higher level, Durrant retired from football in July 2012: "I've got really into running/triathlon since my ultra marathon and have taken up golf and back into tennis, and with work commitments and more travel, have decided I just can't commit this year so time to move on."

International career
Durrant made her debut for the Wales senior team, aged 17, in March 2003. She replaced Cheryl Foster after 76 minutes of a 1–1 Algarve Cup draw against Portugal in Lagoa. Six days later Durrant scored her first international goal, giving Wales the lead six minutes into a 2–2 draw with the Republic of Ireland.

Durrant made her first appearance for the National Team on Welsh soil in a 2–0 Euro 2009 qualifying defeat to Switzerland in October 2007.

Personal life
Durrant is a graduate of Loughborough University. She was employed as a marketing manager in the sports industry.

References

1985 births
Living people
Footballers from Aberystwyth
Welsh women's footballers
Wales women's international footballers
Doncaster Rovers Belles L.F.C. players
Birmingham City W.F.C. players
Coventry United W.F.C. players
Alumni of Loughborough University
FA Women's National League players
FIU Panthers women's soccer players
Women's association football midfielders
Welsh expatriate sportspeople in the United States
Welsh expatriate footballers
Expatriate women's soccer players in the United States